The 2015 Horizon League softball tournament was held at Oakland Softball Stadium on the campus of Oakland University in Rochester Hills, Michigan from May 6 through May 9, 2015. The tournament winner earned the Horizon League's automatic bid to the 2015 NCAA Division I softball tournament. All games were broadcast on ESPN3.

Format
The Horizon League Tournament takes the top 6 teams and places them in a double elimination tournament. Seeds 1 and 2 get a bye to the 2nd Round.

Tournament

All times listed are Eastern Daylight Time.

References

Horizon League softball tournament
Horizon League